In geology, a basement high is a portion of the basement in a sedimentary basin that is higher than its surroundings. Commonly, structures referred to as basement highs are hidden by the sedimentary fill of the basin. Usually basement highs are elongated features of tectonic origin.